Michael D. Ferrero (born 1968) is a botanist who specialises in the systematics and ecology of the Arecaceae, with emphasis on the genera, Calyptrocalyx, Gronophyllum, Hydriastele and has described more than 20 new species of palms. He has collected in Indo China, Thailand, Australasia and Papua New Guinea,

Some publications
Dowe,J.L. & Ferrero, M.D. (2000) Gronophyllum cariosum, an Ornamental New Species from Papua New Guinea, Palms 2000 Vol.44 No.4 pp. 161–165. 
Dowe, J.L. & Ferrero, M.D. (2001) Revision of Calyptrocalyx and the New Guinea species of Linospadix (Linospadicinae: Arecoideae: Arecaceae)  Blumea 46: 207-251 
Dowe, J,L. & Ferrero, M.D. (2000) A new species of rheophytic palm from New Guinea. Palms, 44 (4). pp. 194–197.

References

External links

20th-century Australian botanists
1968 births
Living people
21st-century Australian botanists